Asen Nikolov (born 5 August 1976 in Plovdiv), nicknamed Bebeto (Бебето), is a Bulgarian footballer playing as an attacking midfielder. For the Bulgarian national team, Nikolov was capped one time.

Career
After spending the first three years of his career in his home town with Maritsa, Nikolov relocated to Sofia in June 1997, signing a five-year contract with Levski, with whom he was Champion of Bulgaria two times (2000, 2001) and won Bulgarian Cup in 1998 and 2000.

In January 2002, Slavia Sofia signed Nikolov to a four-year deal. In Slavia he earned 68 appearances playing in the A PFG and scored five goals, before moving to PFC Turan Tovuz in Azerbaijan, where he has established himself as one of the best players in the country.

In August 2006, Nikolov signed a three-year contract with Serbian club FK Partizan at the request of the manager, Miodrag Ješić, who noticed his talent while working in Bulgaria. Yet, on 20 September 2006, just one month after the transfer was made and with only several games played for the club, Nikolov was substituted in the 38th minute of the Serbian Cup game against FK ČSK Pivara, because of "extremely low performance, physical capacity of an aged man and being a bad influence on the team spirit". Ješić has also said that it was "definitely the last game Nikolov had played for Partizan".

In the next season he returned to Azerbaijan, signing a contract with FK Baku. After that played six months and in FK Qäbälä.

In January 2009, the 32-year-old Nikolov returned to Bulgaria and signed with Slavia Sofia.

Honours
Levski
 Bulgarian A PFG: 1999–2000, 2000–01, 2001–02
 Bulgarian Cup: 1998, 2000, 2002

References

External links
  Player website from Levski2000
 
 Profile at LevskiSofia.info

1976 births
Living people
Bulgarian footballers
Bulgaria international footballers
Bulgarian expatriate footballers
Association football midfielders
First Professional Football League (Bulgaria) players
FC Maritsa Plovdiv players
PFC Levski Sofia players
PFC Slavia Sofia players
Turan-Tovuz IK players
FK Partizan players
Serbian SuperLiga players
FC Baku players
Expatriate footballers in Azerbaijan
Expatriate footballers in Serbia
Expatriate footballers in France
Gabala FC players
US Pontet Grand Avignon 84 players
Azerbaijan Premier League players
Bulgarian expatriate sportspeople in Azerbaijan